John Casey was a Scottish football player, who played for Dumbarton during the 1930s.

References 

Scottish footballers
Dumbarton F.C. players
Scottish Football League players
Association footballers not categorized by position
Year of birth missing